Marie-Jeanne Boucher (born Marie-Jeanne Buseau 1716 - died in 1796) was a French artist, miniaturist and engraver of the 18th century.

Biography 
At the age of 17, on April 21, 1733, Marie-Jeanne Buseau, daughter of Jean-Baptiste Buseau, and of Marie-Anne de Sédeville, residing in rue l'Évêque, married in Saint-Roch church, the painter François Boucher who then lived in rue Saint-Thomas-du-Louvre, in the parish of Saint-Germain-l'Auxerrois, according to the marriage certificate, transcribed by the Goncourt brothers. The couple still lived there in 1736 when their second child was born.

Marie-Jeanne had previously posed for Boucher, and in 1732 in the painting Renaud et Armide, she is the model for the blonde Armide. It is the work presented by her future husband, to enter the Royal Academy. Boucher then seems to have often been inspired by her image in his creations of radiant and triumphant young beauties.

From this marriage were born three children, a daughter, Jeanne-Élisabeth Victoire, baptized on March 24, 1735; a son, Juste-Nathan, baptized on May 4, 1736, and a second daughter, Marie-Émilie, born on April 27, 1740. The two daughters married, on April 7, 1758, in Saint-Germain-l'Auxerrois, the painters Baudouin and Deshays.

Marie-Jeanne Boucher did not only pose for her husband. La Tour exhibited at her first Salon, in 1737, a pastel representing her in a white satin dress with a square neckline and trimmed with a ruche, her neck slightly veiled by the lace of a scarf, and tormenting a closed fan of her hands gloved in white fingerless mittens and lined in pink. Lundberg made a pastel of her which appeared at the Salon of 1743, and the Swedish painter Roslin exhibited her portrait at the Salon of 1761. Gabriel de Saint-Aubin made a sketch of it in the margin of his copy of the Livret.

Work 
In the 18th century, the Royal Academy of Painting and Sculpture admitted only a very limited number of women and none as "history painter", a superior genre which alone gave access to the title of professor. The wives of artists' families most often had to confine themselves to "feminine subjects", painting of flowers, portraits, miniatures. They thus reach a notoriety which assures them ease, but not recognition. Marie-Anne Fragonard's miniatures will be attributed to her husband Jean-Honoré Fragonard, and will contribute to his revaluation.

Marie-Jeanne Boucher worked with her husband, engraved some of his drawings, and reproduced several of his paintings in miniature.

Eight of these small works were mentioned in the painter Aved's sales catalog in 1766, and according to the Goncourts, these miniatures were still attributed to François Boucher in the 19th century.

A large miniature on parchment was sold by Josse in 1893, it is a copy of the Entry of Psyche into her palace, after the painting by Boucher exhibited at the Salon of 1739 and executed in tapestry at Beauvais. This tapestry is now part of the collections of the Petit Palais in Paris.

She produced and signed two etchings from the collection of Principles and Drawing Studies by Bloemaert published in June 1735.

According to the Goncourt Brothers, there is a plate of Two sleeping peasants, where, next to Boucher inv., we read Uxor ejus sculpsit (his wife engraved it).

She also exhibited several portraits and miniatures at the Salon de la Correspondance created by Pahin de La Blancherie in 1779.

References 

1716 births
1796 deaths
French artists